The Nanning–Yulin high-speed railway is a high-speed railway line currently under construction in China. It is expected to be completed in 2023.

History
Construction began on 15 January 2019.

Stations
The western terminus of the line is Nanning East. The eastern terminus is Yulin North. The line will have three intermediate stations: Liujing, Hengxian, and Xingye South.

References

High-speed railway lines in China